The 2003–04 Premier Soccer League was won by Kaizer Chiefs.

Table

References

2003-04
2003–04 in African association football leagues
2003–04 in South African soccer